Agordo (Local Ladin: Agort, Ladin: Ègort, Austrian German: Augarten) is a town and comune (municipality) sited in the Province of Belluno, in the Veneto region in Italy.

Agordo was the headquarters of Luxottica Group S.p.A., the world's biggest eyewear company, before it was moved to Milan.

Twin towns
 Zugliano, Italy
 Dolomieu, France

References